Aztecacris gloriosa, the atascosa gem grasshopper, is a species of spur-throated grasshopper in the family Acrididae. It is found in the southwestern United States and Mexico.

References

External Links

 

Melanoplinae
Articles created by Qbugbot
Insects described in 1935